Etna Furnace, also known as Mount Etna Furnace, Aetna Furnace, and Aetna Iron Works, is a historic iron furnace complex and national historic district located at Catharine Township, Blair County, Pennsylvania.  The district includes five contributing  buildings, six contributing sites, and two contributing structures.  It encompasses a community developed around an iron furnace starting in 1805.  Included in the district is the four-sided stone furnace (1808), gristmill site (c. 1793), canal locks (c. 1832), site of lock keeper's house (c. 1832), aqueduct (c. 1832, rebuilt 1848), two small houses, the ruins of a charcoal house (1808), the foundation of a tally house, a blacksmith shop (c. 1831), bank barn (c. 1831), foundation of a boarding house, three family tenant house, two iron master' mansions (one destroyed), a store and paymaster's office (c. 1831), Methodist / Episcopal Church (1860), and cemetery with graves dating between 1832 and 1859.

It was added to the National Register of Historic Places in 1973, with a boundary increase in 1991.

References

External links

Historic American Engineering Record in Pennsylvania
Historic districts on the National Register of Historic Places in Pennsylvania
Buildings and structures in Blair County, Pennsylvania
National Register of Historic Places in Blair County, Pennsylvania